Drašković (meaning "son of Draško") is a surname used in Croatia, Montenegro and Serbia, and may refer to:

 Drašković family, Croatian noble family
 Juraj Drašković (1525–1587), Croatian cardinal and ban (viceroy)
 Ivan II Drašković (1550–1613), Croatian ban
 Ivan III Drašković (1603–1648), Croatian ban
 Janko Drašković (1770–1856), Croatian national reformer, politician and poet
 Milorad Drašković (1873–1921), Serbian politician
 Dušan Drašković (born 1939), Montenegrin-Ecuadorian football coach
 Vuk Drašković (born 1946), Serbian writer and politician
 Tibor Draskovics (born 1955), Hungarian politician
 Žarko Drašković (born 1965), Montenegrin football player

See also 
 

Croatian surnames
Serbian surnames
Patronymic surnames
Surnames from given names